The 2020 Syracuse Orange football team represented Syracuse University during the 2020 NCAA Division I FBS football season. The Orange were led by fifth-year head coach Dino Babers and played their home games at the Carrier Dome, competing as members of the Atlantic Coast Conference.

Syracuse finished their season with a 1–10 record, their worst record since 2005.

Previous season

The Orange finished the season 5–7, 2–6 in ACC play to finish in sixth place in the Atlantic Division.

Schedule
Syracuse had games scheduled against Colgate, Rutgers, and Western Michigan, which were all canceled due to the COVID-19 pandemic.

The ACC released their schedule on July 29, with specific dates selected on August 6.

Game summaries

at North Carolina

at Pittsburgh

Georgia Tech

Duke

Liberty

at Clemson

Wake Forest

Boston College

at Louisville

NC State

at Notre Dame

Players drafted into the NFL

References

Syracuse
Syracuse Orange football seasons
Syracuse Orange football